Damián is a Czech, Slovak and Spanish male given name, which is a form of the name Damian. Damian is derived from the Greek name Δαμιανος (Damianos), from the Greek word δαμαζω (damazo), meaning "to tame" or "to master". The given name may refer to: 

Damián Akerman (born 1980), Argentine football player
Damián Alcázar (born 1953), Mexican actor
Damián Anache (born 1981), Argentine composer
Damián Batallini (born 1996), Argentine footballer
Damián Blaum (born 1981), Argentine swimmer
Damián de Santo (born 1968), Argentine actor
Damián Domingo (1796–1834), Filipino painter
Damián Díaz (born 1986), Argentine football player
Damián Escudero (born 1987), Argentine footballer
Damián Genovese (born 1978), Venezuelan actor
Damián Iguacén Borau (born 1916), Spanish bishop
Damián Ísmodes (born 1989), Peruvian football player
Damián Lizio (born 1989), Bolivian football player
Damián Manso (born 1979), Argentine footballer
Damián Pérez (born 1988), Argentine football player
Damián Suárez (born 1988), Uruguayan football player
Damián Szifron (born 1975), Argentine film and television director 
Damián Villa (born 1990), Mexican taekwondo athlete

References

Spanish masculine given names